Emlen Franklin (April 7, 1827 – June 19, 1891) was an American politician.

Franklin, the youngest son of Judge Walter Franklin, was born in Lancaster, Pennsylvania, on April 7, 1827.  He entered Yale College in 1845 and graduated in 1847.  He read law with Nathaniel Ellmaker, Esq., of Lancaster, and was admitted to the bar in May, 1850. He began immediately the practice of his profession in Lancaster, and in the autumn of 1854 was elected to the Pennsylvania House of Representatives, but declined a re-election after having served for one term. From 1859 to 1862 he was District Attorney of Lancaster County. Upon the breaking out of the American Civil War, he volunteered with a militia company of which he was Captain for the three months' service ; and in 1862 raised the 122nd Regiment of Pennsylvania Volunteers, of which he was chosen Colonel, and which he commanded for nine months—the period of its service; during which time he participated in the battles of Fredericksburg and Chancellorsville.  He returned home in May, 1863, and in June, upon the invasion of Pennsylvania by Gen. Robert E. Lee, he raised a regiment of militia, and in command of one of the brigades shared in that campaign.  After the discharge of the troops Col. Franklin resumed the practice of his profession, and during the fall of 1863 was elected Register of Wills of Lancaster County, for a three years' term.  His health was impaired by his service in the army, and he died in Lancaster after a brief closing illness, on June 19, 1891, in his 65th year.

In early life he married a daughter of Michael Withers, of Lancaster, who survived him with two sons and one daughter.

References

External links
 

1827 births
1891 deaths
Politicians from Lancaster, Pennsylvania
Yale College alumni
Members of the Pennsylvania House of Representatives
Pennsylvania lawyers
Union Army colonels
19th-century American politicians
American lawyers admitted to the practice of law by reading law
19th-century American lawyers
Military personnel from Pennsylvania